The Dirty Nil is a Canadian rock band from Hamilton, Ontario, who won the Juno Award for Breakthrough Group of the Year at the Juno Awards of 2017. The band consists of singer and guitarist Luke Bentham, drummer Kyle Fisher, and bassist Sam Tomlinson.

History

The band members began playing together in high school, and formed The Dirty Nil in 2006. They released their debut single "Fuckin' Up Young" in 2011, and began touring North America, performing in clubs and at festivals. They followed with a series of further singles and EPs and released their full-length debut album Higher Power in 2016. Following that album's success, they released Minimum R&B, a compilation of the early singles and EP tracks in 2017. The Dirty Nil released their second studio album Master Volume on September 14, 2018 on Dine Alone Records, and released the first single from the album, "Bathed in Light". In August 2020, the band announced a new album titled Fuck Art, which was released on January 1, 2021.

Musical style
Music critics commonly label the band under the punk rock genre. The band mixes the swaggering riffs of hard rock with the attitude and energy of punk. Despite these classifications, the band defines themselves as just a rock band.

Discography

Studio albums
Higher Power (2016)
Master Volume (2018)
Fuck Art (2021)

Compilations
Minimum R&B (2017)

EPs
Saccharine Visceral (2009)
Little Metal Baby Fist (2012)
Smite (2014)

Singles
"Fuckin' Up Young" (2011)
"Zombie Eyed" (2013)
"Cinnamon/Guided by Vices" (2014)
"No Weaknesses" (2015)
"Surrender" (2018)
"Bathed in Light" (2018)
"Pain of Infinity" (2018)
"I Don't Want That Phone Call" (2018)
"That's What Heaven Feels Like" (2018) – No. 31 Mainstream Rock Songs
"Christmas at My House" (2019)
"Done With Drugs" (2020)
"Doom Boy" (2020)
”Blunt Force Concussion” (2020) - No. 34 Alternative Airplay
”One More and the Bill” (2020)
”Bye Bye Big Bear” (2022)

References

2006 establishments in Ontario
Canadian alternative rock groups
Canadian punk rock groups
Musical groups from Hamilton, Ontario
Juno Award for Breakthrough Group of the Year winners
Dine Alone Records artists
Musical groups established in 2006
Canadian musical trios